Newry is a city in Northern Ireland, standing on the Clanrye river in counties Down and Armagh. It is near the border with the Republic of Ireland, on the main route between Belfast (34 miles/55 km away) and Dublin (67 miles/108 km away). The population was 27,913 in 2021.

Newry was founded in 1157 as a settlement around a Cistercian abbey. In the 16th century the English dissolved the abbey and built Bagenal's Castle on the site. Newry grew as a market town and a garrison, and became a port in 1742 when Newry Canal was opened, the first summit-level canal in Ireland. A cathedral city, it is the episcopal seat of the Roman Catholic Diocese of Dromore. In 2002, as part of Elizabeth II's Golden Jubilee, Newry was granted city status along with Lisburn.

Name
The name Newry is an anglicization of An Iúraigh, an oblique form of An Iúrach, which means "the grove of yew trees".

The modern Irish name for Newry is An tIúr, which means "the yew tree". An tIúr is an shortening of Iúr Cinn Trá, "yew tree at the head of the strand", which was formerly the most common Irish name for Newry. This relates to an apocryphal story that Saint Patrick planted a yew tree there in the 5th century.

The Irish name Cathair an Iúir (City of Newry) appears on some bilingual signs around the city.

History

There is evidence of continual human habitation in the area from early times. During the Bronze Age, the Newry area had a community who were making in abundance very detailed jewellery for garments. Three of these Newry Clasps can be found in the Ulster Museum, and a massive arm clasp from the same period was also found in Newry.

In AD 820, Vikings landed in the Newry area, "from whence they proceeded to Armagh, taking it by storm, and plundering and desolating the country around".

Early history
A Cistercian abbey was founded at Newry in 1157, when it was granted a charter by Muirchertach Mac Lochlainn, king of Tír Eoghain and High King of Ireland. It might have been a Benedictine monastery before this. Newry Abbey (now the area around Newry Museum) would have been a sprawling complex of buildings and the heart of a monastic settlement. It existed for four centuries. The abbey was dissolved by the English in 1548, when it was recorded that it consisted of a church, steeple, college, chapter house, dormitory, a hall, a graveyard, two orchards and one garden. Modern archaeologists unearthed thirty-three burials from part of the former graveyard, and further bones were found in charnel pits. They included remains of men, women, and several youths, and some of the individuals suffered violent deaths. It is believed this was a graveyard for the lay community from when the abbey was still in existence.

In April 1552, Nicholas Bagenal, Marshal of the English army in Ireland, was granted ownership of the former abbey lands. He built a fortified house known as Bagenal's Castle on the site of the abbey and its graveyard, re-using some of the abbey buildings. Bagenal also had an earthen rampart built around his Castle and the small town of Newry.

During the Irish Rebellion of 1641, Newry was captured by Irish Catholic rebels led by the Magennises and McCartans. In May 1642, a Scottish Covenanter army landed in Ulster and seized Newry from the rebels. James Turner, one of the Scottish officers, recounted that Catholic rebels and civilians were taken to the bridge over the Newry River and "butchered to death ... some by shooting, some by hanging ... without any legal process". The Scottish general, Robert Monro, said that sixty townsmen and two priests were summarily executed. Turner also said that Scottish soldiers drowned and shot about a dozen Irishwomen before he stopped them killing more.

During the 1689 Raid on Newry, Williamite forces under Toby Purcell repulsed an attack by the Jacobites under the Marquis de Boisseleau. At the period of the Battle of the Boyne, the Duke of Berwick set fire to the parts of the town which he had restructured to defend it.

Modern era
By 1881 the population of Newry had reached 15,590.

During the Irish War of Independence there were several assassinations and ambushes in Newry. On 12 December 1920, British reinforcements travelling from Newry to Camlough were ambushed by the Irish Republican Army (IRA), who opened fire and threw grenades from MacNeill's Egyptian Arch. Three IRA volunteers were fatally wounded in the exchange of fire.

When Ireland was partitioned in 1921, Newry became part of Northern Ireland. From the 1920s to the 1960s, Newry Urban District Council was one of the few councils in Northern Ireland which had a majority of councillors from the Catholic/Irish nationalist community. The reason, according to Michael Farrell, was that this community formed such a large majority in the town, around 80% of the population, making it impossible to gerrymander. Also an oddity was that for a time it was controlled by the Irish Labour Party, after the left wing of the Northern Ireland Labour Party defected to them in the 1940s.

Newry saw several violent incidents during the conflict known as the Troubles, including a triple killing in 1971, a bombing in 1972, and a mortar attack in 1985. These continued into the late 1990s and even in 2010 – such as bomb scares and car bombs.

See also: The Troubles in Killeen, for information on incidents at the border and customs post at Newry on the border with the Republic of Ireland and close to Newry. In 2003, the British Army's hilltop watchtowers overlooking Newry were taken down. The British Army withdrew from the area on 25 June 2007 when they closed their final base at Bessbrook.

Geography
Newry lies in the most south-eastern part of both Ulster and Northern Ireland. About half of the city (the west) lies in County Armagh and the other half (the east) in County Down. The Clanrye River, which runs through the city, forms the historic border between County Armagh and County Down.

The city sits in a valley, between the Mourne Mountains to the east and the Ring of Gullion to the south-west, both of which are designated Areas of Outstanding Natural Beauty.  The Cooley Mountains lie to the south east. The Clanrye River runs through the centre of town, parallel to the Newry Canal. The city also lies at the northernmost end of Carlingford Lough, where the canal enters the sea at Victoria Locks.

Townlands
Newry is within the civil parishes of Newry and Middle Killeavy. The parishes have long been divided into townlands, the names of which mainly come from the Irish language. The following is a list of townlands in Newry's urban area, alongside their likely etymologies:

Demography
On Census day (27 March 2011) there were 26,967 people living in Newry, accounting for 1.49% of the NI total. Of these:

 21.46% were aged under 16 years and 12.74% were aged 65 and over;
 51.02% of the usually resident population were female and 48.98% were male;
 88.27% belong to or were brought up in the Catholic religion and 8.47% belong to or were brought up in a 'Protestant and Other Christian (including Christian related)' religion;
 56.12% had an Irish national identity, 27.27% had a Northern Irish national identity and 12.65% indicated that they had a British national identity (respondents could indicate more than one national identity);
 35 years was the average (median) age of the population;
 19.60% had some knowledge of Irish (Gaelic) and 2.37% had some knowledge of Ulster-Scots.

Climate
As with the rest of Northern Ireland, Newry has a temperate climate, with a narrow range of temperatures, regular windy conditions, and rainfall throughout the year.

Economy
Newry has a reputation as one of the best provincial shopping-towns in Northern Ireland, with the Buttercrane Centre and The Quays Newry attracting large numbers of shoppers from as far away as Cork.

In 2006 Newry house prices grew the most across the whole United Kingdom over the previous decade, as prices in the city had increased by 371% since 1996. The city itself has become markedly more prosperous in recent years. Unemployment has reduced from over 26% in 1991 to scarcely 2% in 2008.

Since the inception of the global financial crisis of 2008–2009, residents of the Republic of Ireland have increasingly been cross-border shopping to Newry to buy cheaper goods due to the difference in currency. The harsh budget in the Republic of Ireland in October 2008, and the growing strength of the euro against the pound sterling and VAT reductions in the United Kingdom, compared with increases in the Republic of Ireland, are among the reasons. This remarkable increase in cross-border trade has become so widespread that it has lent its name to a general phenomenon known as "the Newry effect". In December 2008, The New York Times described Newry as "the hottest shopping spot within the European Union's open borders, a place where consumers armed with euros enjoy a currency discount averaging 30 percent or more".

However the increased flow of trade has led to resultant tailbacks, sometimes several miles long (many kilometres), on approach roads from the south. This has created huge traffic and parking problems in Newry and the surrounding area. It has also become a political issue, with some politicians in the Republic of Ireland claiming that such cross-border shopping is "unpatriotic". By 2010 "the Newry effect" declined, with 45% of shoppers' cars at Newry and other northern shopping centers from the Republic, compared to 70% in early 2009. InterTradeIreland estimated that cross-border shopping was 1.4% of national retail spending in the Republic, compared to 2% in 1988.

Newry is the global HQ of FD Technologies Plc.

Governance

Local government
The city of Newry is part of Newry, Mourne and Down District Council. The 2019 Newry, Mourne and Down District Council election resulted in 3 Sinn Féin, 2 SDLP and 1 Independent councillors being elected in the Newry electoral area, only change from the 2014 result was Kevin McAteer who went from SDLP to Independent in 2015 stood down in 2017 to be replaced by Michael Savage. Individually Roisín Mulgrew replaced her party colleague Liz Kimmens, while independent Davy Hyland was replaced by another independent, Gavin Malone.

Northern Ireland Assembly

Newry is part of the Newry and Armagh assembly constituency.  In the 2017 elections, the following were elected to the Northern Ireland Assembly: Megan Fearon, Cathal Boylan, Conor Murphy (all members of Sinn Féin), Justin McNulty of the SDLP and William Irwin of the DUP.

Westminster
Together with part of the district of Newry, Mourne and Down, Newry forms the Newry & Armagh constituency for elections to the Westminster Parliament and Northern Ireland Assembly. The Member of Parliament is Mickey Brady of Sinn Féin. He won the seat in the 2015 United Kingdom general election.

Transport

Transport history

In 1885 an electric tramway, the Bessbrook and Newry Tramway, was opened between Newry and Bessbrook.

MacNeill's Egyptian Arch is a railway bridge located near Newry. It was selected for the design of the British One Pound coin to represent Northern Ireland for 2006.

Services
Newry railway station, just off the Camlough road, offers cross border services on the Dublin-Belfast line as well as some regional services around areas of County Armagh and County Down. Transport to other places generally requires a change in either Belfast or Dublin. Planning permission for the construction of a new station to the east of the current station, was granted in May 2006 and the new station opened on 7 September 2009 by Northern Ireland Railways.

In terms of bus transport, Newry is served by an Ulsterbus bus station in the city centre. The bus station is located along The Mall, suspended over the Clanrye River. Services in Newry include local, regional and cross-border transport with a free shuttle bus service to the local train station and services to local schools around Newry and Mourne.

Newry is on the main M1/A1 route from Dublin to Belfast. Originally the route passed through the town centre, but in the 60s was bypassed by the Abbey Link. This remained the sole relief road until 1996 when it was superseded by a single carriageway bypass round the western side of the town. By 2008 the road on either side of the town had been upgraded to motorway/high quality dual carriageway standard (southwards from Cloghogue) and low quality dual carriageway (northwards from Beechill). In July 2010 a new high quality dual carriageway with motorway characteristics was opened to bridge the gap, thus connecting Dublin with Belfast by motorway/dual carriageway for the first time. The opening of this section of Road meant that motorists could travel from Clogh in County Antrim to Midleton, County Cork by dual carriageway/motorway. Part of this older bypass is still in use between the Camlough Road (A25) and the Belfast Road (A1). Newry suffers from very heavy traffic with shoppers coming from across the border.

Newry is linked to Belfast via National Cycle Route 9, via Portadown, Lisburn and Craigavon.

Notable buildings

Saint Patrick's Church was built in 1578 on the instructions of Nicholas Bagenal, who was granted the monastery lands by Edward VI, and is considered to be the first Protestant church in Ireland.

The Cathedral of SS Patrick and Colman on Hill Street was built in 1829 at a cost of £8,000. The structure, which consists of local granite, was designed and built by Thomas Duff, arguably Newry's greatest architect to date.

Newry Town Hall is notable for being built over the River Clanrye which is the historic boundary between the counties of Armagh and Down.

The Craigmore Viaduct lies just north of the city on the Northern Ireland Railways Belfast-Dublin mainline. The bridge was designed by Sir John MacNeill with construction beginning in 1849. The bridge was formally opened in 1852. The viaduct consists of eighteen arches the highest being 126 feet, the highest viaduct in Ireland. The Enterprise Train link from Belfast to Dublin crosses the bridge.

Daisy Hill Hospital, which has its origins in the Newry Union Workhouse and Infirmary of 1841, was rebuilt in 1902.

Churches
Roman Catholic churches in Newry include the Cathedral of Saints Patrick and Colman (Hill Street; built 1825–1829), the Church of the Sacred Heart and St Catherine (Dominic Street; 1875), St Brigid's (Derrybeg; 1970), St Mary's on Chapel Street (1789; formerly Newry Cathedral), the Church of the Sacred Heart (1916; colloquially connected to Cloghoge, but really localized in Drumalane Townland) and the Church of the Assumption (Drumalane; 1954).

Protestant churches serving the area include St Patrick's Church of Ireland (possibly the first Protestant church ever built in Ireland in 1578), St Mary's Church of Ireland (1819), the Methodist Church on Sandy's Street, Newry Baptist Church on Downshire Place, the First Presbyterian Church (Non-Subscribing) on John Mitchel Place (designed by W.J. Barre), Downshire Road Presbyterian Church (1843), Sandy's Street Presbyterian Church, Riverside Reformed Presbyterian Church, The Salvation Army on Trevor Hill and Metropolitan Church on Edward Street.

The Jehovah's Witnesses have a Kingdom Hall on Belfast Road.

Sport

Football
Until 2012, Newry City F.C. played at the Showgrounds before being liquidated. A phoenix club named Newry City AFC was formed to play in amateur leagues in 2013, and was promoted to the NIFL Premiership in 2018.

Gaelic games

The Down GAA team has its home ground at Páirc Esler in the city.

Rugby
Newry RFC (also known as Newry Rugby Club, Newry RFU or Newry) is an Irish amateur rugby union club, founded in 1925. The club is a member of the Irish Rugby Football Union's Ulster branch. The club currently fields three senior teams and several junior teams ranging from under-12 to under-18 and a women's team for the first time in 2010–2011 season. The club's home ground is known as Telford Park. The team currently has two playing fields located at this ground along with the clubhouse on the outskirts of Newry.

Education

There are approximately 10 primary schools in the area, including Killean Primary School and St Malachy's Primary School.

Local post-primary schools include Abbey Christian Brothers Grammar School, Newry High School, Our Lady's Grammar School, Sacred Heart Grammar School, St Colman's College, St Joseph's Boys' High School, St. Mary's High School and St. Paul's High School, Bessbrook.

Southern Regional College, a further and higher education college, has campus facilities in Newry.

Notable people

Arts and media

Christine Bleakley, television host
Margaret Clarke, (1884–1961), portrait painter
Thomas Duff, (1792–1848), architect
Julia Glover, 18th and 19th century stage actress
Frank Hall, (1921–1995), broadcaster and satirist
Seán Hillen, photographer and artist
Valene Kane, actress
Michael Legge, actor
 Actor siblings John and Susan Lynch
Tomm Moore, filmmaker
Gerard Murphy, actor

Groups
The 4 of Us – rock band
Luv Bug, pop group
Crubeen, a 1970s folk band
Gama Bomb - thrash metal band

Religion
John Dunlop, Presbyterian churchman
John Magee, Roman Catholic Bishop of Cloyne

Academia and science
Leonard Abrahamson (1896-1961), cardiologist
Joseph Barcroft (1872–1947), respiratory physiologist
W. J. Barre (1830–1867), architect
Elizabeth Gould Bell (1862–1934), doctor

Politics and diplomacy
Sir Trevor Corry (1724–1780) British diplomat
Isaac Corry (1753-1813) Member of Parliament for Newry (1776), Irish Chancellor of the Exchequer (1799-1802)
Sir William Hill Irvine (1858 – 1943), Australian politician
 Alfred Ludlam (1810 – 1877), New Zealand politician and philanthropist
John Martin (8 September 1812 – 29 March 1875), Irish nationalist
John Mitchel, Irish patriot
Pádraig Ó Cuinn (1898 – August 1974), Irish Republican Army
Charles Russell, Baron Russell of Killowen, (1832–1900), Lord Chief Justice of England and Wales

Sport
 Shay McCartan, footballer
 Michael Cusack (1847–1906), founder of the Gaelic Athletic Association
 Pat Jennings, footballer
Willie Maley (1868 – 1958), football manager
Danny McAlinden, heavyweight boxer
Ryan McGivern, footballer
Terence Bannon, mountaineer
Peter McParland, footballer
Seán O'Neill, Gaelic footballer
Ronan Rafferty, golfer

See also
Newry (civil parish)
List of localities in Northern Ireland by population

References

External links

Newry City.com

 
Populated places established in the 12th century
Civil parish of Newry
Cities in Northern Ireland